Cliff Smith may refer to:

Cliff Smith, guitarist in Ultimate Beatles and The Forgers
Cliff Smith (golfer), see NCAA Division III Men's Golf Championships
Cliff Smith (musician) in Basic Radio
Cliff Smith (filmmaker) see The Return of Draw Egan

See also
 Clifford Smith (disambiguation)